Caversham is a suburb of Perth, Western Australia, located in the City of Swan.

It contains many wineries as part of the Swan Valley wine region.
It is the location of brick and tile manufacturers, with Brisbane & Wunderlich establishing a tile manufacturing factory in 1953.
It has long been associated with agricultural pursuits and has regularly had a show. 

It has also has been the location of child welfare properties such as Riverbank.  In the 2000s Caversham was the location of a detention centre known as the Disability Justice Centre.
The Hall - originally known as the  Soldiers and Sailors Memorial Hall built in 1921, was replaced by the Caversham and District Memorial Hall.

It also was the location of the Caversham Wildlife Park, which has since moved into Whiteman Park.

It was the location of a war-time airstrip, the Caversham Airfield, which was later utilised as a motor-raceway.

References

External links 
 Caversham Suburb Profile from Link House and Land.

Suburbs of Perth, Western Australia
Suburbs and localities in the City of Swan